Hostage for a Day is a 1994 Canadian television comedy film directed by John Candy, in his only directorial effort. Though the film is also billed as "starring" Candy, he in fact plays only a minor role, as a Russian hostage taker. Produced with a mostly Canadian cast, the film was released one month after Candy's death.

Plot
Forty one year old copy shop worker Warren Kooey begins having a mid-life crisis. His plans are to take a trip to the state of Alaska, but his plans are derailed after his wife drains his entire bank account (approximately $40,000) to pay for a remodelling job by famous home builder and blond, long haired Italian heartthrob "Hondo."

In order to recuperate his money Kooey decides to pose as being held hostage by an imaginary Russian terrorist, and calls the SWAT Team on himself in an effort to extort $50,000 (to Kooey's disappointment, the incompetent SWAT team has suffered major budget cuts). Things take a turn for the worse, when Russian terrorist Yuri Petrovich takes Kooey hostage.

Cast

External links

1994 films
1994 comedy films
Canadian crime comedy films
English-language Canadian films
Films directed by John Candy
Midlife crisis films
Films about kidnapping
Films with screenplays by PJ Torokvei
1990s English-language films
1990s Canadian films